Tania Tinoco (August 2, 1963 – May 21, 2022) was an Ecuadorian journalist, author, television producer, director, TV and radio presenter, reporter, interviewer, and opinion leader. For more than 30 years she has been known as the host of the Ecuavisa nightly newscast, Televistazo.

Biography
Tania Tinoco was born in Machala on August 2, 1963. At the age of 11, together with her father Colón Tinoco, she went to live in Guayaquil, where she studied at the  de La Inmaculada.

At age 15, she was a member of the school's Journalism Club. Her first report for the school magazine was about an interview with the singer José Luis "El Puma" Rodríguez, granted after much insistence to his manager. This cemented her decision to pursue journalism as a profession.

In December 1983, at age 20, with the help of the director of her college who recommended her to the Human Resources manager of Ecuavisa, she was brought on by the channel to work in the filing.

In 1986, Nila Velásquez, then director of the Sunday newscast and current opinion editor of the newspaper El Universo, recommended to  that he choose Tania to read the news. Thus she became part of the evening news show Telemundo, alongside Borges.

On May 30, 1992, Tinoco married Bruce Hardeman, a Swiss businessman with whom she has two children.

In 1994 her father died, followed six months later by Alberto Borges, who had been her companion on the news for eight years.

Tania Tinoco was the director and presenter of the news program Telemundo and the investigative program , both on Ecuavisa.

Awards
On January 29, 2015, Tinoco was presented with the Eugenio Espejo National Journalism Prize by the National Union of Ecuadorian Journalists (UNP) in the television category, for the documentary titled Los niños de Génova.

References

1963 births
2022 deaths
Ecuadorian journalists
Ecuadorian women journalists
Ecuadorian television presenters
Ecuadorian women television presenters
People from Machala
Television journalists
Television producers
Women television journalists
Women television producers
21st-century Ecuadorian women
Universidad Laica Vicente Rocafuerte de Guayaquil